The R24 is a major East-West provincial route in the Gauteng and North West provinces that links OR Tambo International Airport with Rustenburg via Johannesburg, Krugersdorp and Magaliesburg. The process of renaming the streets and freeway that form the route from Krugersdorp eastward to OR Tambo International after anti-apartheid stalwart Albertina Sisulu was completed in 2013.

After passing through Central Johannesburg and some of Johannesburg's eastern suburbs (a section maintained by the Johannesburg Roads Agency, a department of the City of Johannesburg), the route becomes a freeway outside Eastgate Shopping Centre in Bedfordview, a section which is maintained by the Gauteng Department of Roads and Transport, part of the Gauteng Provincial Government. This freeway section of the route intersects with the N3 and the N12 at George Bizos Interchange. There are offramps that lead to Edenvale, and parts of Kempton Park, before the road ends in the vicinity of OR Tambo International Airport, at the R21 leading to Pretoria and Boksburg.

Route

Gauteng
The R24 begins at Johannesburg International Airport (OR Tambo International Airport) in the East Rand (Ekurhuleni), Gauteng.

It heads west as a freeway, beginning with an interchange with the R21 (Pretoria-Boksburg Highway), then heads west-south-west through the southern edge of Kempton Park (where it has a junction at Lazarus Mawela Road, formerly Barbara Road – M59) and Edenvale (where it has a junction at Lungile Mtshali Road, formerly Van Riebeeck Road/Edenvale Road – M37).

In Bedfordview (just after the Edenvale off-ramp), the R24 joins the N12 Freeway from Mpumalanga westwards towards Johannesburg for almost 2 km, with an e-toll gantry on that section of the national road (open road tolling; the only toll on the entire R24 Route) (there is no e-toll on the eastward side of the freeway).

Many motorists complained of the Loerie e-toll being positioned on the R24, as they believed that the R24 was meant to be a toll-free route for its entire length in which nobody would be charged for transporting from Johannesburg International Airport (OR Tambo International Airport) in Kempton Park to Johannesburg Central. As the R24 in Gauteng is not a route maintained by SANRAL and was not indicated as a toll road, motorists and companies wondered why motorists were being charged for being on a National Road for only 2 km on the route from Johannesburg's Airport to Johannesburg's city centre. But SANRAL has since changed the signs on both highways connected (N12 & R24) so as for them to indicate that there is an e-toll ahead when travelling westwards to the N3 interchange (every lane on the N12 and R24 west cosigned section passes through the gantry).

Right after the e-toll, at the George Bizos Interchange (previously Gillooly's Interchange) with the N3 Highway, the N12 leaves the westerly highway and joins the N3 Eastern Bypass southwards on the Johannesburg Ring Road, leaving the R24 as the straight road west into Johannesburg. Just after the interchange with the N3 & N12, it passes north of the Eastgate Shopping Centre and leaves the City of Ekurhuleni Metropolitan Municipality to enter the City of Johannesburg Metropolitan Municipality. Here, the R24 stops being a freeway.

It passes through some of Johannesburg's eastern suburbs in a south-westerly direction, including Bruma, Kensington and Troyeville, before entering the Johannesburg CBD and becoming two one-way streets (one going east as Albertina Sisulu Road, formerly Market Street, and the other west as Commissioner Street). The Carlton Centre, the second tallest building in Africa (the tallest office building in Africa), is located on Commissioner Street. Just before crossing under Johannesburg's M1 Freeway at the suburb of Ferreirasdorp (south of Newtown), it intersects with the eastern terminus of the R41 Road (Main Reef Road) and becomes one street westwards (no longer one-way streets). The R41 route is an alternative route to the R24 route as they both go west to Roodepoort.

Next, the R24 runs west to Roodepoort. It passes through the Fordsburg, Mayfair, Mayfair West, Langlaagte North, Crosby, Industria (where it continues by a left & right turn) and Bosmont suburbs before it crosses the N1 Highway (Johannesburg Western Bypass; Johannesburg Ring Road) at the Maraisburg junction and enters Roodepoort. After passing through the Maraisburg and Florida suburbs, the R24 runs in a northwesterly direction through the former CBD of Roodepoort. After bypassing Westgate Shopping Centre, the R24 leaves the City of Johannesburg Metropolitan Municipality and enters Krugersdorp in the Mogale City Local Municipality.

Through Krugersdorp, it first passes by Factoria before passing through the southern end of Krugersdorp CBD, where it intersects with the R28 Route. After Krugersdorp West, the R24 makes up the southern border of the Krugersdorp Game Reserve. It then heads north-west, crossing the N14 National Route, towards Magaliesburg, which is a holiday and weekend destination for people of Johannesburg and Pretoria. On this section, before Magaliesburg, it passes by the Tarlton International Raceway. It forms the main road through Magaliesburg, meeting the eastern terminus of the R509 Route before meeting the south-western terminus of the R560 Route.

North West
After Magaliesburg in the Mogale City Local Municipality, the R24 leaves Gauteng and enters the North West Province in a northwesterly direction. It heads for Olifantsnek, where it meets the northern end of the R30 Route and bypasses the Kgaswane Mountain Reserve and the Olifantsnek Dam. After the Kgaswane Reserve, it crosses the N4 Highway (Platinum Highway) and enters the City of Rustenburg adjacent to the Waterfall Mall. It meets the R104 (Fatima Bhayat Street) just after crossing the Platinum Highway and proceeds for another 1 kilometre north-north-east to end at a t-junction just west of the Hex River. The entire section of the R24 in North-West Province was regarded as a national road in September 2012 and is now operated by SANRAL.

Geography

Street name
By October 2013, every street and freeway that makes up R24 from OR Tambo International Airport, Kempton Park, Ekurhuleni, through Johannesburg and Roodepoort, to Krugersdorp was officially named after Albertina Sisulu, with the only exceptions being in some one-way-street sections of the route. In Johannesburg CBD, the street for vehicles going westwards is named Commissioner Street (while the parallel street going the other direction is still named Albertina Sisulu Road). In the Maraisburg suburb of Roodepoort, the street for vehicles going eastwards is named 9th Street (while the parallel street going the other direction is still named Albertina Sisulu Road). In the former CBD of Roodepoort, the street for vehicles going westwards is named Oliver Street (while the parallel street going the other direction is still named Albertina Sisulu Road).

There were plans to rename Commissioner Street to Albertina Sisulu Road and the family of Sisulu welcomed this proposal but as of 2019, the change has not taken place.

The use of the street name "Albertina Sisulu Road" ends in Krugersdorp East (just after leaving Roodepoort), at the junction with Coronation Street. From there, through Krugersdorp CBD, it is known as Luipaard Street. After Krugersdorp CBD, it is known as Rustenburg Road for the remainder of its length, from Krugersdorp, through Magaliesburg, up to Olifantsnek Dam, where it enters Rustenburg.

As the R24 is known as the Albertina Sisulu Freeway in Ekurhuleni between Eastgate Shopping Centre and OR Tambo International Airport, the use of the name doesn't end there. The R21 e-toll freeway is often also called the Albertina Sisulu Freeway, particularly the section from its OR Tambo International Airport interchange with the R24 north to the Flying Saucer Interchange with the N1 southeast of Pretoria in City of Tshwane Metropolitan Municipality. Together, the R24 & R21 make up the only other "highway system" after the Ben Schoeman Highway that connects Pretoria and Johannesburg.

The R21 e-toll freeway, together with the freeway section of the R24, was already named the Albertina Sisulu Freeway by the time of the 2010 FIFA World Cup while the remainder of the R24 to Krugersdorp was renamed in 2013.

References

External links
 Routes Travel Info

24
24
Streets and roads of Johannesburg
Highways in South Africa
Provincial routes in South Africa